Papyrus 82 (in the Gregory-Aland numbering), designated by 𝔓82, is an early copy of the New Testament in Greek. It is a papyrus manuscript of the Gospel of Luke. The surviving texts of Luke are verses 7:32-34,37-38. The manuscript paleographically had been assigned to the 4th century (or 5th century).

 Text 
The Greek text of this codex probably is a representative of the Alexandrian text-type. Aland placed it in Category II.

 Location 
It is currently housed at the Bibliothèque nationale et universitaire (P. Gr. 2677) in Strasbourg.

See also 

 List of New Testament papyri
 Papyrus 85

References

Further reading 

 J. Schwartz, Fragment d’evangile sur papyrus, Zeitschrift für Papyrologie und Epigraphik 3 (Bonn: 1967), pp. 157–158.

New Testament papyri
4th-century biblical manuscripts
Bibliothèque nationale de France collections
Gospel of Luke papyri